Michael Colleary is an American film producer, screenwriter and television writer. His writing credits include Face/Off, Firehouse Dog, The New Alfred Hitchcock Presents, the story for Lara Croft: Tomb Raider, and the Cartoon Network live-action series Unnatural History.

He is a frequent collaborator with Mike Werb.  Together they won a Saturn Award for their original screenplay of Face/Off.

Colleary is the writer-showrunner of the independently financed, action-adventure TV series, Professionals, starring Tom Welling, Brendan Fraser, and Elena Anaya, which currently airs on the CW network.

Colleary was born and raised in Montclair, New Jersey.  He is married to screenwriter Shannon Bradley-Colleary, whose film "To the Stars" premiered at the Sundance Film Festival in 2019.

References

External links

Film producers from New Jersey
American male screenwriters
American television writers
Living people
Place of birth missing (living people)
Year of birth missing (living people)
American male television writers
People from Montclair, New Jersey
Screenwriters from New Jersey